Vladimir Vasiliev may refer to:

 Vladimir Vasiliev (dancer) (born 1940), dancer with the Bolshoi Ballet
 Vladimir Vasilyev (rower) (born 1948), Soviet Olympic rower
 Vladimir Vasilyev (politician) (born 1949), Russian politician
 Vladimir Vasilyev (rally driver) (born 1969), Russian rally raid driver
 Vladimir Vasilyev (sailor) (1935-2003), Soviet Olympic sailor
 Vladimir Vasilyev (scientist) (born 1951), scientist and rector at ITMO University
 Vladimir Vasilyev (writer) (born 1967), science fiction writer

See also
Vasiliev